

Curt von Jesser (4 November 1890 – 18 August 1950) was an Austrian general in the Wehrmacht of Nazi Germany during World War II. He was a recipient of the Knight's Cross of the Iron Cross.

Jesser was born on November 4, 1890 in Wadowice as the son of future Austrian-Hungarian Feldmarschalleutnant Moritz von Jesser. He entered the Austrian Army on August 18, 1909 with the rank of Kadett-Offiziersstellvertreter and was assigned to the 6th Rifle-Regiment (Schützen Regiment 6). He remained in Austrian service after World War I and became a Wehrmacht soldier after the Anschluss of Austria in 1938. 

In World War II he was promoted to the rank of Generalmajor. He commanded the 155. Reserve-Panzer-Division from 24 August 1943 to 6 September 1943. 

Between June and August 1944, he commanded , also known as Kampfgruppe Jesser or "Jesser Brigade" in operations against Maquis in rural France.
He was given command of Festungsabschnitt Steiermark in 1945. At the end of the war he was taken prisoner by the British Army and tried for war crimes.

Curt von Jesser died in Vienna on 18 August 1950.

Awards

 Knight's Cross of the Iron Cross on 18 January 1942 as Oberst and commander of Panzer-Regiment 36
 German Cross in Gold (29 November 1941)
 Iron Cross, 1st Class (1939)
 1939 Clasp to the Iron Cross 2nd Class
 Austrian Military Merit Cross, 3rd class with War Decoration (World War I award)
 Austrian Military Merit Medal in Silver with Swords (World War I award)
 Austrian Military Merit Medal in Bronze with Swords (World War I award)
 1914 Iron Cross 2nd Class (World War I award)
 Karl Troop Cross (World War I award)
 Austria-Hungary Wound Medal (World War I award)
 Panzer Badge in Silver
 Wehrmacht Long Service Award 1st Class

References

1890 births
1950 deaths
People from Wadowice
Austro-Hungarian military personnel of World War I
Major generals of the German Army (Wehrmacht)
People from the Kingdom of Galicia and Lodomeria
Recipients of the clasp to the Iron Cross, 2nd class
Recipients of the Gold German Cross
Recipients of the Knight's Cross of the Iron Cross
Austrian prisoners of war
People from Austrian Silesia
Austrian military personnel of World War II
Austro-Hungarian Army officers
Austrian people convicted of war crimes
World War II prisoners of war held by the United Kingdom
German Army generals of World War II